The New York Yankees are a Major League Baseball (MLB) franchise based in The Bronx, New York City, New York. They play in the American League East division. The first game of the new baseball season for a team is played on Opening Day, and being named the Opening Day starter is an honor, which is often given to the player who is expected to lead the pitching staff that season, though there are various strategic reasons why a team's best pitcher might not start on Opening Day. The Yankees have used 58 different Opening Day starting pitchers in their 110 seasons. No decisions are only awarded to the starting pitcher if the game is won or lost after the starting pitcher has left the game. Although in modern baseball, ties are rare due to extra innings, in 1910, New York's Opening Game against the Boston Red Sox was declared a tie due to darkness – at the time, Hilltop Park had lacked adequate lighting.

Whitey Ford, Ron Guidry, and Mel Stottlemyre hold the Yankees record for most Opening Day starts with seven. The other pitchers with three or more Opening Day starts for New York are CC Sabathia (6), Lefty Gomez (6), Red Ruffing (5), Jack Chesbro (4), Roger Clemens (4), Bob Shawkey (4), Masahiro Tanaka (4), Ray Caldwell (3), Jimmy Key (3), Vic Raschi (3), and most recently Gerrit Cole (3). Jimmy Key holds the Yankee record for best Opening Day record with a perfect 3–0.

On Opening Day, Yankee pitchers have a combined record of 35–12–1 when playing at home. Of those games, pitchers have a 1–0 record at Oriole Park, a 3–1–1 record at Hilltop Park, a 2–3 record from Polo Grounds, a 28–8 record at Yankee Stadium, and a 1–0 record at Shea Stadium. When on the road for Opening Day, Yankee pitchers have a combined record of 28–27.

The franchise has Opening Day record of 1–1 as Baltimore. As the Highlanders, they had a 6–3–1 Opening Day record. For seasons in which New York would later win the World Series, the starting pitchers have a 16–8 record.

Key

Pitchers

References 
General

Specific

Opening day starters
Lists of Major League Baseball Opening Day starting pitchers